Grass Valley is a city in Sherman County, Oregon, United States. The population was 164 at the 2010 census.

Geography

Demographics

2010 census
As of the census of 2010, there were 164 people, 74 households, and 47 families living in the city. The racial makeup of the city was 97.0% White, 0.6% Native American, 0.6% from other races, and 1.8% from two or more races. Hispanic or Latino of any race were 3.0% of the population.

There were 74 households, of which 23.0% had children under the age of 18 living with them, 47.3% were married couples living together, 14.9% had a female householder with no husband present, 1.4% had a male householder with no wife present, and 36.5% were non-families. 29.7% of all households were made up of individuals, and 20.3% had someone living alone who was 65 years of age or older. The average household size was 2.22 and the average family size was 2.74.

The median age in the city was 52 years. 21.3% of residents were under the age of 18; 2.4% were between the ages of 18 and 24; 18.2% were from 25 to 44; 29.3% were from 45 to 64; and 28.7% were 65 years of age or older. The gender makeup of the city was 45.7% male and 54.3% female.

2000 census
As of the census of 2000, there were 171 people, 75 households, and 47 families living in the city. The population density was 335.3 people per square mile (124.6/km2). There were 93 housing units at an average density of 175.9 per square mile (67.8/km2). The racial makeup of the city was 95.32% White, 2.34% Native American, 1.17% Asian, and 1.17% from two or more races. Hispanic or Latino of any race were 3.51% of the population.

There were 75 households, out of which 26.7% had children under the age of 18 living with them, 49.3% were married couples living together, 12.0% had a female householder with no husband present, and 37.3% were non-families. 34.7% of all households were made up of individuals, and 22.7% had someone living alone who was 65 years of age or older. The average household size was 2.28 and the average family size was 2.96.

In the city, the population was spread out, with 24.0% under the age of 18, 5.8% from 18 to 24, 22.2% from 25 to 44, 21.6% from 45 to 64, and 26.3% who were 65 years of age or older. The median age was 44 years. For every 100 females, there were 87.9 males. For every 100 females age 18 and over, there were 80.6 males.

The median income for a household in the city was $25,417, and the median income for a family was $31,250. Males had a median income of $41,250 versus $30,417 for females. The per capita income for the city was $13,843. About 6.0% of families and 13.6% of the population were below the poverty line, including 31.0% of those under the age of eighteen and 9.5% of those 65 or over.

Points of interest
Oregon Raceway Park is a 2.3-mile dedicated road course facility just east of the town that hosts competitive automobile, kart and motorcycle events.

References

External links
 Entry for Grass Valley in the Oregon Blue Book
Profile of Grass Valley from Sherman County
 Historic photos of Grass Valley from Salem Public Library

Cities in Oregon
Cities in Sherman County, Oregon
1901 establishments in Oregon
Populated places established in 1901